Lo language may refer to:
 Lo-Toga language, an Oceanic language of Vanuatu
 Guro language, a Mande language of Ivory Coast
 Loo language, an Adamawa language of Nigeria

See also 
 Lao language, ISO 639-1 code: lo